Areegra is a locality in Victoria, Australia. It is located on Rupanyup Road in the Shire of Yarriambiack.

Areegra Post Office opened on 1 October 1880 and closed in 1981.

References

Towns in Victoria (Australia)
Mallee (Victoria)